Uno Alarik Hildén (4 April 1890, Ingå - 2 February 1951) was a Finnish agronomist, farmer and politician. He was a member of the Parliament of Finland from 1930 to 1933 and again from 1936 to 1945, representing the Swedish People's Party of Finland.

References

1890 births
1951 deaths
People from Ingå
People from Uusimaa Province (Grand Duchy of Finland)
Swedish People's Party of Finland politicians
Members of the Parliament of Finland (1930–33)
Members of the Parliament of Finland (1936–39)
Members of the Parliament of Finland (1939–45)
Finnish people of World War II
Swedish University of Agricultural Sciences alumni